John Deal may refer to:
 John Kelsey Deal (1843–1892), American politician in the state of Iowa
 John Nathan Deal (born 1942), American politician in the state of Georgia
 John Deal (soccer) (1905–1983), American soccer forward